Wayne McLoughlin (1944–2015) was a Welsh artist who dedicated his drawings to nature. He was most known for his cover art in Erin Hunter's Warriors and Seekers series.

McLoughlin began as a young explorer in Hampstead Heath, London, and later, in the swamps of northern Florida. Fascinated by nature, he often recorded his experiences in sketches and paintings. McLoughlin served in the United States Marine Corps during the Vietnam War before studying both Fine Art and Anthropology at San Diego State University. He first worked on creating illustrated humor parodies for national magazines, including Esquire, Omni, Yankee, and National Lampoon. He illustrated for Citibank, Ford Motor Company, IBM, Motorola, Adidas, Texaco, MasterCard, the National Geographic Society, Audubon, Scientific American, Woods Hole Oceanographic Institution, and the Nature Museum in Grafton, Vermont. His artwork can also be found in outdoor magazines such as Sports Afield and Sporting Tales, as well as many books and publications that focus on animals and aspects of nature, such as the bestselling Warriors and Seekers novel series.

The Internet Speculative Fiction Database credits McLoughlin with the cover art of dozens of books.

He lived with his wife, Jackie, in Bellows Falls, Vermont. Their daughter, Allison, lives in New Hampshire with her husband, Christopher Judkins. Wayne died at 71 years old in 2015.

References

External links
Wayne's official website is Blue Loon Fine Arts
isfbd Summary Bibliography: Wayne McLoughlin

Welsh illustrators
Warriors (novel series)
Living people
1944 births